Melissa Lackey Oremus (born November 17, 1978) is an American politician. She is a member of the South Carolina House of Representatives from the 84th District, serving since 2019. She is a member of the Republican party.

Oremus is a member of the South Carolina Freedom Caucus.  She also serves on the House Labor, Commerce and Industry Committee.

Electoral history

References

External links

Living people
1978 births
Republican Party members of the South Carolina House of Representatives
21st-century American politicians
University of South Carolina Aiken alumni
Southern Wesleyan University alumni
21st-century American women politicians
People from Aiken, South Carolina

Women state legislators in South Carolina